Without Some Help is a 2006 compilation album by Alpha. It consists of 8 songs by other artists, which were remixed by Alpha, and 4 collaborations between Alpha and guest vocalists.

A download-only, 11-track version, Without Some Help. Net Edition, was also made available from Alpha's website. The download-only version differs from the general release by the exclusion of "Yellow" by Coldplay, "Inertia Creeps" by Massive Attack, "Jack" by Edition (all remixed by Alpha) and the inclusion of an original Alpha track, "Ariel."

Track listing

References

External links
 

2006 compilation albums
Alpha (band) albums